Damuluru is a village in NTR district of the Indian state of Andhra Pradesh. It is located in Ibrahimpatnam mandal under Vijayawada revenue division.

References 

Villages in NTR district